Northern Dutchess Paramedics (NDP EMS) provides advanced life support (ALS) and basic life support (BLS) ambulance transportation services in the Hudson Valley region of New York, USA. NDP operates ambulances staffed by emergency medical technicians (EMTs) and paramedics. NDP holds emergency response 9-1-1 contracts in Dutchess County, Columbia County and Litchfield County. Within Dutchess County, NDP has been assigned a department ID number of "84".

History
NDP was founded in 1994 by paramedics Edward Murray and Robert Latimer and was New York State's first licensed, stand alone advanced life support first response service. Since then the company expanded to advanced life support services, as well as basic life support services and ambulance and inter-facility transport. Outside of the response mode, NDP offers EMS continuing education, first aid and safety training for the community and classes for allied health professionals.

Alamo/NDP merger
On December 14, 2007, NDP announced a proposed merger with Alamo EMS, whose parent company is Health Quest, the largest health care system in the Hudson Valley. The application was the first step in the regulatory process toward creating an organization which was aimed at better serving the Hudson Valley community in providing emergency and ambulance services. The joint venture also required approval from the New York State Attorney General’s Office and the New York State Supreme Court. Health Quest and Northern Dutchess Paramedics anticipated that the regulatory process would take approximately six to twelve months. However, on December 17, 2008, the two companies announced that the merger had fallen through, and would not be completed. The companies claimed they had differences that could not be settled. If merged, it would have been the largest independent ambulance provider in the Hudson Valley Region.

Loss of contracts
On November 21, 2008, at 5:30 pm, NDP officially lost its ALS contract for the towns of Beekman and Pawling, for failure to have an official Certificate of Need (CON). Alamo EMS resumed operations in the two towns. NDP claims the loss of the CON was no fault of theirs and that the responsibility lies with the town boards of Pawling and Beekman. In mid-November, it had been discovered that the New York State Department of Health had never issued NDP a CON for Southern Dutchess County and NDP should never have been allowed to operate in that area without the CON.

Ambulette Division 
NDP operated an ambulette division consisting of 6 multipassenger wheelchair vans. This division was formed in 1998 to meet the needs of facilities served by the agency. In 2016, shortly after the loss of a major contract, the division was disbanded due to decreased revenue.

References

External links
 Northern Dutchess Paramedics Home Page

Ambulance services in the United States
Medical and health organizations based in New York (state)